Xavier Chauveau is a French professional rugby union player. He plays scrum-half for Racing Métro in the Top 14.

Honours
 Racing 92
Top 14: 2015–16

References

External links
Ligue Nationale De Rugby Profile
European Professional Club Rugby Profile
Racing Metro Profile

1992 births
Living people
Racing 92 players
French rugby union players
Rugby union scrum-halves